Tarangalu means Waves in some Indian languages.
 Jeevana Tarangalu is a 1973 Telugu Drama film directed by T. Rama Rao.
 Prema Tarangalu is a 1980 Tollywood film.